In applied mathematics, a transcendental equation is an equation over the real (or complex) numbers that is not algebraic, that is, if at least one of its sides describes a transcendental function.
Examples include:

A transcendental equation need not be an equation between elementary functions, although most published examples are.

In some cases, a transcendental equation can be solved by transforming it into an equivalent algebraic equation.
Some such transformations are sketched below; computer algebra systems may provide more elaborated transformations.

In general, however, only approximate solutions can be found.

Transformation into an algebraic equation
Ad hoc methods exist for some classes of transcendental equations in one variable to transform them into algebraic equations which then might be solved.

Exponential equations
If the unknown, say x, occurs only in exponents:
 applying the natural logarithm to both sides may yield an algebraic equation, e.g.
 This will not work if addition occurs "at the base line", as in 
 if all "base constants" can be written as integer or rational powers of some number q, then substituting y=qx may succeed, e.g.
 This will not work if squares or higher power of x occurs in an exponent, or if the "base constants" do not "share" a common q.
 sometimes, substituting y=xex may obtain an algebraic equation; after the solutions for y are known, those for x can be obtained by applying the Lambert W function, e.g.:

Logarithmic equations
If the unknown x occurs only in arguments of a logarithm function:
 applying exponentiation to both sides may yield an algebraic equation, e.g.
This requires the original equation to consist of integer-coefficient linear combinations of logarithms w.r.t. a unique base, and the logarithm arguments to be polynomials in x.
 if all "logarithm calls" have a unique base  and a unique argument expression  then substituting  may lead to a simpler equation, e.g.
After that, applying inverse operations to the substitution equation yields

Trigonometric equations
If the unknown x occurs only as argument of trigonometric functions:
 applying Pythagorean identities and trigonometric sum and multiple formulas, arguments of the forms  with integer  might all be transformed to arguments of the form, say, . After that, substituting  yields an algebraic equation, e.g.
After that, applying  obtains the solutions.

Hyperbolic equations
If the unknown x occurs only in linear expressions inside arguments of hyperbolic functions,
 unfolding them by their defining exponential expressions and substituting  yields an algebraic equation, e.g.
Applying  obtains the solutions of the original equation.

Approximate solutions

Approximate numerical solutions to transcendental equations can be found using numerical, analytical approximations, or graphical methods.

Numerical methods for solving arbitrary equations are called root-finding algorithms.

In some cases, the equation can be well approximated using  Taylor series near the zero.

For a graphical solution, one method is to set each side of a single-variable transcendental equation equal to a dependent variable and plot the two graphs, using their intersecting points to find solutions (see picture).

Other solutions 
 Some transcendental systems of high-order equations can be solved by “separation” of the unknowns, reducing them to algebraic equations.
For example, we want to solve . It is easy to show that  and  so if there is a solution to the equation, it must satisfy . From  we get . Indeed,  and so  is the only real solution to the equation.

See also

References

  

Equations